Palmas Bellas is a corregimiento in Chagres District, Colón Province, Panama. As of 2010, it had a population of 1,844, up from 1,690 in Panamanian census of 2000.

References

Corregimientos of Colón Province
Road-inaccessible communities of Panama